The Fat Girl Gets a Haircut and other Stories is a 12-part play, created by artist Mark Storor in collaboration with a cast of teenage actors. The play was first performed in The Roundhouse at Chalk Farm, North London, UK, on 26 April 2011, and set to run until 7 May 2011. Artist / Director Mark Storor is known for his work in the play For the Best at the (Unicorn Theatre, London, and Unity Theatre, Liverpool) about a dialysis drama for children. Musical Director Jules Maxwell was in charge of the neo-classical score, while animator Babis Alexiadis provided rich and sensory illustrations throughout the play.

The 12 portraits are tales of love, family, sexuality, religion, bullying, angst, freedom, lust, and abstract interpretations of modern teenage challenges concerning insecurities, rebellion, acceptance, and the ultimate path to adulthood.

Making
The play was two years in the making, with Mark Storor meeting with 11 young teenagers once a week, teaching them about the techniques of theatre. The company crafted stories providing insight into teenage life in Britain in modern times. Few words were spoken throughout the play, but wide range of music, from jazz, jive, boogie, to ballad, served as the vessel to unfolding the many layers of symbolism and ethereal voyage of teenagers' minds.

Reviews
The play was well received by critics, given 4 stars out of 5 by The Guardian (UK), and Time Out (London). British Theatre Guide also made positive reviews, praising the fascinating insights of the play, and the artistic crafts of Babis Alexiadis:

Play

The Fat Girl Gets a Haircut and other Stories:

1.	We Let Them Look at Us 
2.	And Then I Fell
3.	Swallow 1
4.	Burlesque Boy part 1
5.	The Boy Who Cried for the World
6.	Burlesque Boy part 2
7.	Infidel
8.	Daddy's Girl
9.	My Body My Secret
10.	Swallow 2
11.	How to Make a Paper Daffodil
12.	Fairground

References

External links 
 Fat Girl Gets a Haircut Facebook page
 Fat Girl Gets a Haircut videos
 Official Fat Girl Gets a Haircut site at Roundhouse

2011 plays
British plays
Plays set in the United Kingdom